Katumbi Airport  was an airport  southwest of the village of Katumbi, Republic of Malawi.

In aerial views, the runway appears to have been abandoned sometime after 2002. Trees and shrubs are now growing on the runway area, and runway markings have been removed.

See also
Transport in Malawi
List of airports in Malawi

References

External links
OpenStreetMap - Katumbi Airport closed
FallingRain - Katumbi Airport

Defunct airports
Airports in Malawi